The  was a Japanese domain of the Edo period, located in Bitchū Province (modern-day Niimi, Okayama).

List of lords

Seki clan, 1697-1871 (Tozama; 18,000 koku)

Nagaharu
Nagahiro
Masatomi
Masatoki
Naganobu
Nagateru
Shigeakira
Nagamichi
Nagakatsu

References
 Niimi on "Edo 300 HTML" (19 Oct. 2007)

Domains of Japan